Behram may refer to:
 A male Persian name meaning the hypostasis of victory
 Angel of victory in Zoroastrianism
 Atash Behram, a Zoroastrian place of worship

People
 Behram Contractor (1930–2001), Journalist
 Behram Khan (cricketer) (born 1987), Pakistani cricketer
 Behram Kurşunoğlu (1922–2003), Turkish physicist
 Behram Zülaloğlu (born 1982), Turkish footballer
 Fozia Behram, Pakistani politician
 Thug Behram (died 1840), Indian serial killer

Places
 Behram, Ayvacık
 Behram (crater), an impact crater on Saturn's moon Enceladus
 Behramkale, the modern site of ancient Assus in Turkey

See also 
 Bahram (disambiguation)
 Vahram (disambiguation)